Steven G. Kellman (born November 15, 1947) is an American critic and academic, best known for his books Redemption:The Life of Henry Roth (2005) and The Translingual Imagination (2000).

Life and career 
Kellman was born in Brooklyn, New York.  A graduate of Harpur College at Binghamton University (1967), he received his M.A. and Ph.D. in comparative literature from the University of California at Berkeley in 1969 and 1972, respectively.

Kellman has taught at the University of California campuses at Irvine and Berkeley.  In 1976, he joined the faculty of the University of Texas at San Antonio, where he was the university's first Ashbel Smith Professor, from 1995-2000, and is currently a professor of comparative literature, specializing in fiction, film, and criticism.  He was a Fulbright Senior Lecturer at Tbilisi State University in 1980 and held the Fulbright Distinguished Chair in American Literature at the University of Sofia in 2000. He is married to the poet Wendy Barker.

The weekly column that Kellman wrote for the San Antonio Light from 1983 until the newspaper's demise in 1993 won the H. L. Mencken Award in 1986. He is a contributing writer for The Texas Observer and the San Antonio Current.  His film reviews were awarded first place in arts criticism by the Association of Alternative Newsweeklies in 2006. His essays and reviews have appeared in The American Scholar, Atlantic Monthly, Bookforum, Huffingtonpost.com, Forward, Southwest Review, Michigan Quarterly Review, New York Times Book Review, Georgia Review, The Nation, San Francisco Chronicle, Los Angeles Times, Chicago Tribune, Atlanta Journal Constitution, Gettsyburg Review, and Virginia Quarterly Review, among many other publications. In 2007, he was awarded the National Book Critics Circle's Nona Balakian Citation for Excellence in Reviewing. Kellman was founding president of the literary center Gemini Ink and was elected into membership in the Texas Institute of Letters. He served two terms on the board of directors of the National Book Critics Circle, from 1996-2002, and began his third term in 2009. He began his fourth term in 2012. In 2010, he began serving as Vice President for Membership of the NBCC.

Kellman's first book, The Self-Begetting Novel, appeared in 1980 and examines a subgenre of modern metafiction in which the protagonist ends up writing the novel in which he appears. Loving Reading: Erotics of the Text (1985) is a study in reader theory that explores the analogy between reading and making love.  In two books, The Translingual Imagination (2000) - which Peter Bush in the Times Literary Supplement called “a passionately eloquent narrative of a new translingual world behind the English Curtain" - and Switching Languages: Translingual Writers Reflect on Their Craft (2003), Kellman surveyed the phenomenon of writers who write in more than one language or in a language other than their primary one. He provided further reflections on literary translingualism in Nimble Tongues (2020). His biography of the author of the 1934 novel Call It Sleep, Redemption: The Life of Henry Roth (2005), received the New York Society Library Award for Biography and was hailed by Josh Lambert in the San Francisco Chronicle as “not only a necessary addition to the annals of American literature, but also a trenchant exploration of the relationship between the horrors of life and the saving power of art." American Suite: A Literary History of the United States, Kellman's first book of poems, appeared in 2018. The Restless Ilan Stavans: Outsider on the Inside, the first book-length study of the prominent public intellectual Ilan Stavans, appeared in 2019. Kellman's selected essays, Rambling Prose, appeared in 2020.

Books
  The Self-Begetting Novel,  1980, New York: Columbia University Press, 1980, London: Macmillan
  Loving Reading: Erotics of the Text, 1985, Hamden, Conn.: Archon
  Approaches to Teaching Camus’s The Plague, (editor), 1985, New York: Modern Language Association
  The Plague: Fiction and Resistance, 1993, Boston: Twayne
  Perspectives on Raging Bull, 1994, (editor), New York: G. K. Hall
  Into The Tunnel: Readings in Gass’s Novel, 1998, (co-editor), Newark: University of Delaware Press
  Leslie Fiedler and American Culture, 1999, (co-editor), Newark: University of Delaware Press
  The Translingual Imagination, 2000, Lincoln, NE: University of Nebraska Press
  Torpid Smoke: The Stories of Vladimir Nabokov, 2000, (co-editor), Amsterdam: Rodopi
  Magill’s Literary Annual, 2001–present, (co-editor), Pasadena: Salem Press
  Underwords: Perspectives on Don DeLillo’s Underworld, 2002, (co-editor), Newark: University of Delaware Press
  Switching Languages: Translingual Writers Reflect on Their Craft, 2003, (editor), Lincoln, NE: University of Nebraska Press
  Redemption: The Life of Henry Roth, 2005, New York: W. W. Norton
  Magill’s Survey of American Literature, rev. ed., 2007, (editor), Pasadena: Salem Press
  Magill’s Survey of World Literature, rev. ed., 2009, (editor), Pasadena: Salem Press
  M. E. Ravage, An American in the Making, (editor), 2009, New Brunswick, NJ: Rutgers University Press
  Critical Insights: Albert Camus, (editor), 2011, Pasadena: Salem Press
  American Suite: A Literary History of the United States. 2018, Georgetown, KY: Finishing Line Press
  The Restless Ilan Stavans: Outsider on the Inside. 2019, Pittsburgh, PA: University of Pittsburgh Press
  Nimble Tongues: Studies in Literary Translingualism. 2020, West Lafayette, IN: Purdue University Press
  Rambling Prose: Essays. 2020, San Antonio, TX: Trinity University Press
  The Routledge Handbook of Literary Translingualism. 2021, (co-editor), New York: Routledge

References 

1947 births
American essayists
American literary critics
Harpur College alumni
Living people
People from Brooklyn
University of California, Berkeley alumni
University of Texas at San Antonio people
University of Texas faculty
American male essayists
Journalists from New York City
James Madison High School (Brooklyn) alumni